Markus Fähndrich (born 24 March 1960) is a Swiss cross-country skier. He competed at the 1984 Winter Olympics and the 1988 Winter Olympics.

References

1960 births
Living people
Swiss male cross-country skiers
Olympic cross-country skiers of Switzerland
Cross-country skiers at the 1984 Winter Olympics
Cross-country skiers at the 1988 Winter Olympics
People from Cham, Switzerland
Sportspeople from the canton of Zug